11 Canis Minoris is a single star in the equatorial constellation of Canis Minor, located around 313 light years away from the Sun. It is visible to the naked eye as a faint, white-hued star with an apparent visual magnitude of 5.25. This object is moving away from the Earth with a heliocentric radial velocity of +28 km/s, having come to within  some 2.35 million years ago.

This is an A-type main-sequence star with a stellar classification of A1Vnn, where the 'n' notation indicates (very) "nebulous" lines due to rapid rotation. However, Gray and Garrison (1987) found a class of A0.5 IVnn, which would instead match an evolving subgiant star. It is a suspected variable star of unknown type. This object is 149 million years old with 2.23 times the mass of the Sun and about 2.5 times the Sun's radius. It is radiating 65 times the Sun's luminosity from its photosphere at an effective temperature of 9,972 K.

References

A-type main-sequence stars
Suspected variables
Canis Minor
Durchmusterung objects
Canis Minoris, 11
62832
037921
3008